Dzerzhinsky District may refer to:
Dzerzhinsky District, Russia, name of several districts and city districts in Russia
Dzerzhynskyi City District, the former name of the Shevchenkivskyi District, Kharkiv, Ukraine

See also
Dzerzhinsky (disambiguation)
Dzerzhinsk (disambiguation)

District name disambiguation pages